Two Frogs is a children's picture book written and illustrated by Chris Wormell, published in 2003 starring Dov and Coles. It won the Nestlé Smarties Book Prize Bronze Award and was shortlisted for the Kate Greenaway Medal.

References

2003 children's books
British children's books
British picture books
Books about frogs
Jonathan Cape books